"Red Hot Sun" is the English name of the Japanese song "Makka Na Taiyo," written by Nobuo Hara. It has been covered many times, by artists such as The Ventures, King Curtis, and the Tokyo Ska Paradise Orchestra.

References 

1960s songs
Year of song missing